Spiruroidea is a superfamily of Spirurida.

They are nematodes.

References

External links 
 

Spirurida
Animal superfamilies